Burlinsky District is an administrative and municipal district (raion), one of the fifty-nine in Altai Krai, Russia. It is located in the northwest of the krai. Its administrative center is the rural locality (a selo) of Burla. Population:  The population of Burla accounts for 35.7% of the district's total population.

References

Notes

Sources

Districts of Altai Krai